A Qudsi (also transliterated as Kudsi) is a Jerusalemite, especially a Palestinian one. It may also refer to:

People
Kudsi Erguner, Turkish musician
Nazim al-Kudsi, Syrian politician
Safwan al-Qudsi, Syrian politician

Religion
Hadith Qudsi

See also
Ghodsi
Maqdisi

Arabic-language surnames